Severe storm hit areas of Khyber Pakhtunkhwa, Pakistan on the night of April 26, 2015. It caused considerable damage in the cities of Peshawar, Nowshera, and Charsadda. The storm featured heavy rains accompanied by hail and high-speed winds of over 120 kilometers per hour (or 75 miles per hour). As a result of the storm's damaging effects, 45 people were killed and over 200 were wounded.

The storm occurred after parts of Pakistan were already partially flooded from prior rainfall in February 2015, up to a meter (or three feet) deep in some places. The storm also collapsed many buildings’ walls and roofs, took down many electricity poles, and killed livestock and damaged many crops in rural Peshawar and Charsadda (including wheat crops and orchards).

Aftermath 
After the storm, many people remained injured or without drinkable water, food, and shelter. The Khyber Pakhtunkhwa government organized and sent members of the Provincial Disaster Management Authority (PMDA) and the military to aid with rescue and recovery efforts in the areas affected.

Subsequent wind, rain and hail in the aftermath of the cyclone disrupted the power supply and telecommunication services in the region. The storm was informally dubbed a “mini-cyclone” in the press. Later analysis by the Pakistan Meteorological Department determined that the event was a tornado.

Heavy weather on the next day forced the Pakistani military to cancel two flights to Nepal taking supplies to survivors of the earthquake on the previous day.

References

External links
 New York Times video coverage of storm
 OCHA's Flood Impact Update map of Pakistan, as of September 2015
 Balochistan Provincial Disaster Management Authority (PDMA)
 Ongoing world disasters monitored by ReliefWeb

Tornado
2015 in Khyber Pakhtunkhwa
2015 natural disasters
Tornado
Disasters in Khyber Pakhtunkhwa
2015 tornado
Tornadoes in Pakistan
Tornadoes of 2015